Walter Stanley Cookson (6 September 1879 – March 1948) was an English professional footballer. He played for Nelson, Bristol City, Blackpool, Wellingborough, Brentford and Portsmouth.

Blackpool
At the start of the 1902–03 season, Cookson joined Blackpool from Bristol City, making his debut on 6 September 1902 at Burslem Port Vale in the opening league game of the season. He was the club's joint-top scorer with eight goals.

After spells with Wellingborough, Brentford and Portsmouth, Cookson returned to Blackpool in 1907. In his second spell at the seaside, he made two League appearances, scoring in one of them. He retired from playing at the end of the 1907–08 campaign, although he remained at Blackpool to help coach the youngsters.

References

English footballers
Nelson F.C. players
Bristol City F.C. players
Blackpool F.C. players
Wellingborough Town F.C. players
Brentford F.C. players
English Football League players
1879 births
1948 deaths
People from Blackpool
Portsmouth F.C. players
Southern Football League players
Association football forwards